Douglas Kerr is a British writer and academic who is best known for his work on Arthur Conan Doyle and George Orwell.

Life and works
Kerr was born in 1951 in Broughty Ferry, Dundee. Kerr went to school in Scotland, where he started reading Conan Doyle and never stopped. He went on to read English at Trinity College, Cambridge in 1969 before completing his PhD in comparative literature at Warwick University in 1978.

In 1979, Kerr travelled to Hong Kong, where he had obtained an appointment as a lecturer in the Department of English Studies and Comparative Literature at the University of Hong Kong.  Over the next 38 years, he advanced his academic career in Hong Kong, appointed associate professor and head of the English Department in 1996, associate Dean of the Faculty of Arts in 2002, Professor of English in 2006 and Dean of the Faculty of Arts in 2014.  Apart from his usual academic responsibilities, Kerr's publication record was prolific, and includes around 110 papers, articles and critiques, among them seven edited scholarly volumes, and five monographs.  His main academic focus has been on the literary history of the later Victorian era and the twentieth century, the literature of empire in Asia and its aftermath, and on cultural biography.  Kerr's research interests also include the literature of war and of travel, the history of literary modernism, and RGC-funded projects on Arthur Conan Doyle, George Orwell and on Joseph Conrad.

Outside of academia, Kerr contributed to Hong Kong's English-language cultural life by reviewing books for the South China Morning Post and hosting 60 programmes of a talk show, The Big Idea, for Radio Television Hong Kong on cultural, historical and scientific themes.   He addressed conferences presenting keynote speeches around the world, promoting excellence in written English with his wife Elaine Ho, also a literary academic.  Kerr served on the board of directors of the Hong Kong International Literary Festival and became its chairman from 2009 to 2011, and participated in various BBC Radio programmes featuring the work of Wilfred Owen, George Orwell and Leonard Woolf.

In 2017, Kerr left Hong Kong and is now living and working in the UK.  He is the general editor of The Edinburgh Edition of the Works of Arthur Conan Doyle, an ambitious multi-volume project to publish scholarly editions of this author's principal writing in fiction and non-fiction, from the publisher of his alma mater, the Edinburgh University Press.  Kerr is also the editor of the first volume in the edition, Memories and Adventures, Conan Doyle's autobiography, which has never been properly edited.  Kerr continues to be engaged with scholarly editing as well as writing about the work of Doyle, Joseph Conrad. and Orwell.  His latest book, Orwell and Empire, will be published in the summer of 2022.

Books

	Wilfred Owen’s Voices (Clarendon Press, 1993)
	George Orwell (Writers and their Works series, 2003)
	A Century of Travels in China: Critical Essays on Travel Writing from the 1840s to the 1940s, co-edited with Julia Kuehn (Hong Kong University Press, 2007)
	Eastern Figures: Orient and Empire in British Writing (Hong Kong University Press, 2008)
	Conan Doyle: Writing, Profession, and Practice (Oxford University Press, 2013)   
	Arthur Conan Doyle, Memories and Adventures, edited

Appointments
	1994 - Visiting Scholar Wolfson College, Oxford
	2000 - Visiting Research Fellow Royal Holloway, University of London
	2005-6	- Honorary Research Fellow Birkbeck, University of London
	2009 – Hong Kong University Output Prize
	2011 - Elected Foundation Fellow of the Hong Kong Academy of the Humanities
	2014-15 - Dean of the Faculty of Arts at Hong Kong University
	2017 - Honorary Professor of English at Hong Kong University
	2018 - Honorary Research Fellow in the School of Arts, Birkbeck College, University of London

Notes

References 

1951 births
Alumni of Trinity College, Cambridge
Alumni of the University of Warwick
Academic staff of the University of Hong Kong
British literary critics
British biographers
British literary historians
Arthur Conan Doyle
Sherlock Holmes scholars
Living people